Lifago is a genus of flowering plants in the tribe Inuleae within the family Asteraceae.

Species
There is only one known species, Lifago dielsii, native to the western part of the Sahara Desert in Algeria and Morocco.

References

Inuleae
Monotypic Asteraceae genera
Flora of North Africa